All Saints Episcopal Church may refer to:

Belgium
All Saints Episcopal Church (Waterloo, Belgium), Waterloo, Belgium

United States
 All Saints' Episcopal Church (Beverly Hills, California)
 All Saints Episcopal Church (Pasadena, California)
 All Saints Episcopal Church (San Diego, California)
 All Saints Episcopal Church (San Leandro, California)
 All Saints Episcopal Church (Denver), listed on the NRHP in Colorado
 All Saints' Church, Delmar, Sussex County, Delaware
 All Saints Episcopal Church (Rehoboth Beach, Delaware)
 All Saints Episcopal Church (Enterprise, Florida), listed on the NRHP in Florida
 All Saints Episcopal Church (Fairbanks, Florida)
 All Saints Episcopal Church (Fort Lauderdale, Florida)
 All Saints Episcopal Church (Jacksonville)
 All Saints Episcopal Church, Waveland (Jensen Beach, Florida)
 All Saints' Episcopal Church (Lakeland), Florida
 All Saints Episcopal Church (Winter Park, Florida), listed on the NRHP in Florida
 All Saints' Episcopal Church (Atlanta), Georgia
 All Saints Episcopal Church (Chicago), Illinois
 Episcopal Church of All Saints (Indianapolis), Indiana
 All Saints Episcopal Church (DeQuincy, Louisiana), listed on the NRHP 
 All Hallows Episcopal Church in Snow Hill, Maryland, listed on the NRHP
 All Hallows Church (South River, Maryland), listed on the NRHP
 All Saints' Church (Easton, Maryland), listed on the NRHP
 All Saints Church (Frederick, Maryland), contributing structure in NRHP Frederick Historic District
 All Saints' Church (Sunderland, Maryland), listed on the NRHP
 All Saints' Church — Ashmont (Boston), Dorchester, Boston, Massachusetts
 All Saints Episcopal Church (Saugatuck, Michigan)
 All Saints' Episcopal Church (Peterborough, New Hampshire)
 All Saints' Episcopal Church (Briarcliff Manor, New York), NRHP-listed
 All Saints Episcopal Church (Round Lake, New York)
 All Saints Episcopal Church (Valley City, North Dakota), on the NRHP in North Dakota
 All Saints Episcopal Church (Portsmouth, Ohio), listed on the NRHP in Ohio
 All Saints' Episcopal Church (Philadelphia), Pennsylvania
 All Saints' Episcopal Church, Waccamaw, South Carolina
 All Saints Episcopal Church (Appleton, Wisconsin)

See also
 All Saints Church (disambiguation)